The Hidley Steam Car was an American  steam car manufactured only in 1901.  One was certainly built, and as many as four may have been produced at the factory in Troy, New York.

References
David Burgess Wise, The New Illustrated Encyclopedia of Automobiles

Defunct motor vehicle manufacturers of the United States
Steam cars